America’s National Churchill Museum (formerly the Winston Churchill Memorial and Library), is located on the Westminster College campus in Fulton, Missouri, United States. The museum commemorates Sir Winston Churchill, the former Prime Minister of the United Kingdom, and comprises three elements: the Church of St Mary Aldermanbury, the museum itself, and the Breakthrough sculpture. In 1677, the church had been renovated by English architect Christopher Wren.

Overview

The central element of America’s National Churchill Museum is the Church of St. Mary, Aldermanbury, a 17th-century church moved stone-by-stone to Fulton from its former location in London, England.

Beneath the church is the Churchill museum, renovated in 2006. Its exhibits tell Churchill's story, discussing his personal and political life and his legacy. Additionally, the Clementine-Spencer Churchill Reading Room houses an extensive research collection about Churchill.

Outside the church stands the Breakthrough sculpture, formed from eight sections of the Berlin Wall. Churchill's granddaughter, artist Edwina Sandys, designed the sculpture to commemorate both the "Sinews of Peace" speech and the fall of the Berlin Wall.

"The Sinews of Peace" address
In 1946, the president of Westminster College, Franc McCluer, reached out to a member of United States President Harry S Truman's administration. This member, a Westminster College alumnus, arranged for Truman to visit the college, and to invite Winston Churchill to speak there. Churchill accepted the invitation, and on March 5, 1946, delivered his famous "Sinews of Peace" address, also known as the "Iron Curtain" speech, as a part of the John Findlay Green Foundation Lecture series, which was witnessed by Truman.

Today, visitors to the museum may view filmed selections of the speech. The lectern and chair that Churchill used are on display in the museum.

Churchill's Living Memorial: St. Mary, Aldermanbury

In 1961, Westminster College President Dr. Robert L. D. Davidson began formulating a plan to commemorate both Winston Churchill's life and the "Sinews of Peace." A LIFE magazine feature on war-ravaged, soon-to-be-demolished Christopher Wren churches in London prompted the suggestion to import one of the churches to serve as both a memorial and the College chapel. After further investigation, college officials selected St. Mary, Aldermanbury as the church to be relocated to the college.

St. Mary, Aldermanbury was chosen because of its relatively small size and its nearly 1,000 year history. Founded in the late 12th century, the church survived the English Reformation, English Restoration, and numerous civil wars. However, on September 2, 1666, the church was destroyed in the Great Fire of London. With approval for rebuilding granted in 1670, architect Christopher Wren began renovating the church in 1672. He rebuilt the church on part of the old foundation with as many of the original stones as could be salvaged. By 1677, the work was essentially complete; the cupola was added to the tower in 1679.

On December 29,1940, during World War II, the German Luftwaffe mounted a massive air raid and St. Mary's suffered a direct hit by an incendiary bomb, causing it to burn down. In the aftermath of the war, few of the destroyed churches were rebuilt, and many, St. Mary's included, remained as ruins. After standing as ruins for 20 years, St. Mary's and several other of London's parish churches were slated for demolition.

At this point, Westminster College stepped in to stop the demolition of St. Mary's and decided to reconstruct it in honor of Winston Churchill. It took four years to finalize preparations for the project, and to raise the necessary $2 million (more than $10 million today) to carry out the reconstruction. Actor Richard Burton was a major promoter and donor, appearing on The Tonight Show with Jack Paar on NBC, who made a direct appeal. 

In 1965, the removal process of St. Mary's began. Workers labeled each of the 7,000 stones, noting their location in the church. More than 700 tons of blocks were shipped to Fulton via boat and rail. In the transportation process, the stones got out of order, complicating the reconstruction of the church.

The foundation stone was laid in October 1966, and by May 1967, the last stone was in place. However, the project required another two years of work to finish reconstructing the interior. English woodcarvers, working from pre-war photographs, created carvings for the pulpit, baptismal font, and balcony. Blenko Glass Company, an American firm, manufactured the glass for the windows, and a Dutch firm cast five new bronze bells for the tower. Noel Mander, the fire warden who watched St. Mary's burn in 1940, built the organ and helped assure authenticity of the interior details. There were two departures from the Wren design: an organ gallery in the west wall, and a window in the tower to illuminate the stairway.

Dedication ceremonies for St. Mary's and The Winston Churchill Memorial and Library were held on May 7, 1969. During the course of the ceremonies, the Rev. Anthony Tremlett, the Bishop of Dover, England, re-hallowed St. Mary's as a place of worship. In 1992, the Eagle Squadrons Association named St. Mary's as its official chapel, and in 2009, the museum was declared “America’s National Churchill Museum” by the United States Congress.

Winston S. Churchill: A Life of Leadership gallery
The museum presents the narrative of Churchill's life. The exhibition begins with Churchill's birth and proceeds through the major events of his life, alongside an examination of the critical events of the 20th century.

One of the focal points of the gallery is the "Admiralty, Army & Arsenal: 1914–1919" room. This portion of the exhibit is housed within a recreation of a World War I trench—complete with barbed wire, sandbags, and spent ammunition—that gives visitors a sense of a British soldier's experience on the Western Front. A periscope mounted on the trench wall gives visitors a glimpse of a real World War I battlescape from period footage. An accompanying audio track plays the sound of soldiers' conversations interspersed with distant gunfire and shell bursts. The World War I room also examines Churchill's role in the disasters of the Dardanelles and Gallipoli and his contributions to the technology of warfare.

Another component of the exhibition is "The Gathering Storm: 1929–1939" room which discusses Churchill's suspicion of Hitler and the Nazi movement. In this room, five video monitors play excerpts from Nazi propaganda films interspersed with images of the impending war. Against this backdrop, the exhibit examines Churchill's view of the Nazis and his disgust for Britain's pre-war appeasement politics.

Another room, "Churchill's Finest Hour: World War II, 1939–1945", portrays World War II and Churchill's role. It contains a sound and light show that replicates an air-raid on London during the "Blitz". It includes simulated rubble, the sounds of bombs detonating and air raid sirens, flashing lights that represent searchlights and anti-aircraft fire, as well as audio clips of war-time broadcasts. After the conclusion of the Blitz demonstration, a short film, narrated by Walter Cronkite, examines Churchill's role as prime minister during the war. More interactive displays describe the war-time skills of code breaking and plane spotting.

Other museum components include "The Sinews of Peace" room and the "Winston's Wit & Wisdom" room. "The Sinews of Peace" tells the story of how and why Churchill came to visit Westminster College. Featured in this exhibit are the lectern and chair used by Churchill during his speech and the ceremonial robes he wore. In "Winston's Wit & Wisdom" visitors sit in a simulated British club while listening to an audio presentation of Churchill stories. Visitors to this room may also search through a database of Churchill's most famous quotations and quips on a host of topics.

Breakthrough
On November 9, 1990, Edwina Sandys, granddaughter of Winston Churchill, introduced her sculpture Breakthrough to the public at America’s National Churchill Museum. Made from eight sections of the Berlin Wall, Breakthrough serves to commemorate the fall of the Berlin Wall, and to memorialize Churchill's "Sinews of Peace." 

In 1990, with the support of Westminster College, Sandys and her husband, Richard Kaplan, had traveled to East Berlin to secure portions of the wall. Upon their arrival in Berlin, however, the couple realized the sculpture would be costly, as -wide sections were selling for $60,000 to $200,000. However, East German officials, intrigued by the idea of erecting a Berlin Wall monument at the location of Churchill's 1946 speech, allowed Sandys to choose eight sections of the wall as a gift to Westminster College.

Sandys chose the sections from an area near the Brandenburg Gate, frequented by artists, because of the dramatic color of the graffiti. The repeated use of the word "unwahr" ("lies" or "untruths") within the sections also appealed to her. Sandys modified the original sections by cutting out large male and female silhouettes from the wall—which symbolized the newly-opened communication between East and West Germany. The silhouette cut-outs are part of a second sculpture entitled Breakfree, located at the Franklin D. Roosevelt Presidential Library and Museum in Hyde Park, New York.

One year after the fall of the Berlin Wall, Sandys unveiled Breakthrough before a crowd of 7,000 people gathered on the campus of Westminster College.

The Green Foundation & Kemper Lecture Series
Since 1937, the College has held the John Findley Green Lectures and the Crosby Kemper Lectures. Both lectures have brought politicians, business leaders, and academics to Westminster College.

The John Findley Green Foundation Lectures were established in 1936 as a memorial to John Findley Green, an attorney in St. Louis who graduated from Westminster College in 1884. The foundation provides for lectures designed to promote understanding of economic and social problems of international concern. The Crosby Kemper Lecture Series was established in 1979 by a grant from the Crosby Kemper Foundation of Kansas City, Missouri. This foundation provides for lectures by authorities on British History and Sir Winston Churchill at America’s National Churchill Museum.

Notes

References
Churchill, Winston S. Speech: The Sinews of Peace, 5 March 1946
Havers, Rob. Churchill Memorial Fulton, Missouri 
Vessell, Nancy. "The Defender of Democracy", News Tribune 3 March 1996.
Watson, Rob. "Churchill Expected Speech to be Major Policy Statement", News Tribune 3 March 1996.
Yorkgits, Lisa. "A Memorial—Stone by Stone", News Tribune 3 March 1996.
"Breakthrough:" A Monumental Sculpture of the Berlin Wall (Westminster College, 1990), 3.

External links

 National Churchill Museum

Religious buildings and structures completed in 1677
Monuments and memorials to Winston Churchill
Archives in the United States
Monuments and memorials in Missouri
Monuments and memorials on the National Register of Historic Places in Missouri
Former churches in Missouri
Former buildings and structures in Missouri
English Baroque architecture
Churchill
National Churchill
University museums in Missouri
Libraries on the National Register of Historic Places in Missouri
Buildings and structures in Callaway County, Missouri
National Register of Historic Places in Callaway County, Missouri